Beneath... Between... Beyond... is the first compilation album by American heavy metal band Static-X, released in 2004. It is a compilation of previously unreleased tracks, remixes, cover versions, and the band's original demo tracks. A track with the same title appeared as a bonus track on iTunes version of the band's album Cannibal, released three years later.

Track listing

Chart positions

Credits

Static-X
 Wayne Static – lead vocals, rhythm guitar; keyboards, programming
 Tripp Eisen – lead guitar; keyboards, programming
 Tony Campos – bass guitar, backing vocals
 Nick Oshiro – drums

Additional personnel
 Koichi Fukuda – lead guitar; keyboards, programming
 Ken Jay – drums
 Josh Freese – drums

References

Static-X compilation albums
Albums produced by Josh Abraham
2004 compilation albums
Warner Records compilation albums